Georgia participated in the Eurovision Song Contest 2022 in Turin, Italy, having internally selected Circus Mircus to represent the country with the song "Lock Me In". Georgia failed to qualify, performing in the second semifinal.

Georgia was drawn to compete in the second semi-final of the Eurovision Song Contest which took place on 12 May 2022. Performing during the show in position 5, "Lock Me In" was not announced among the top 10 entries of the second semi-final and therefore did not qualify to compete in the final. It was later revealed that Georgia placed last out of the 18 participating countries in the semi-final with just 22 points.

Background

Prior to the 2022 contest, Georgia has participated in the Eurovision Song Contest thirteen times since their first entry in 2007. The nation briefly withdrew from the contest in  after the European Broadcasting Union (EBU) rejected the Georgian entry, "We Don't Wanna Put In", for perceived political references to Vladimir Putin who was the Russian Prime Minister at the time. The withdrawal and fallout was tied to tense relations between Georgia and then host country Russia, which stemmed from the 2008 Russo-Georgian War. Following the introduction of semi-finals, Georgia has, to this point, failed to qualify to the final on five occasions.

The Georgian national broadcaster, Georgian Public Broadcaster (GPB), broadcasts the event within Georgia and organises the selection process for the nation's entry. Georgia has selected their entry for the Eurovision Song Contest both through national finals and internal selections in the past. For their  participation, the entry was selected through a national final. In 2018 the artist was internally selected. In 2019, the entry was fully selected through Georgian Idol for the first time ever, and the show was used again to select the singer the following year. The entry failed to qualify from the second semi-final, placing 16th with 16 points.

Before Eurovision

Internal selection 
On 20 September 2021, GPB confirmed their intention to take part in the Eurovision Song Contest 2022. On 11 November 2021, the broadcaster confirmed that they had carried out an internal selection in collaboration with music producers, choosing a group to represent them at the contest. On 14 November 2021, Circus Mircus were announced as the selected entrants. Their entry "Lock Me In" was released on 9 March 2022.

At Eurovision 
According to Eurovision rules, all nations with the exceptions of the host country and the "Big Five" (France, Germany, Italy, Spain and the United Kingdom) are required to qualify from one of two semi-finals in order to compete for the final; the top ten countries from each semi-final progress to the final. The European Broadcasting Union (EBU) split up the competing countries into six different pots based on voting patterns from previous contests, with countries with favourable voting histories put into the same pot. On 25 January 2022, an allocation draw was held which placed each country into one of the two semi-finals, as well as which half of the show they would perform in. Georgia has been placed into the second semi-final, to be held on 12 May 2022, and has been scheduled to perform in the first half of the show.

Once all the competing songs for the 2022 contest had been released, the running order for the semi-finals was decided by the shows' producers rather than through another draw, so that similar songs were not placed next to each other.

Voting

Points awarded to Georgia

Points awarded by Georgia

Jury vote issues
In a statement released during the broadcast of the grand final, the EBU revealed that six countries, including Georgia, were found to have 'irregular' jury voting patterns during the second semi-final. Consequently, these countries were given substitute aggregated jury scores for both the second semi-final and the grand final (shown above), calculated from the corresponding jury scores of countries with historically similar voting patterns as determined by the pots for the semi-final allocation draw held in January. Their televoting results were unaffected. The Flemish broadcaster VRT reported that the juries involved had made agreements to vote for each other's entries to secure qualification to the grand final.

During the broadcast of the final, Georgia's votes were read by the EBU's Executive Supervisor, Martin Österdahl, instead of the scheduled spokesperson, Helen Kalandadze. This was attributed to connection difficulties during the voting, however Azerbaijan's broadcaster İTV, whose jury had also been identified as showing irregular voting patterns, released a statement implying that this was instead due to their refusal to present the calculated aggregate scores. The Georgian broadcaster GPB released a statement requesting further clarification and also revealed that Ukraine would have received the 12 points from the Georgian jury under the removed votes instead of the United Kingdom.

On 19 May, the EBU issued a further statement clarifying the voting irregularities identified in the second semi-final. This confirmed that the six countries involved had consistently ranked each other's entries disproportionately highly: the Georgian jury, as well as the juries from Azerbaijan, Romania and San Marino, had each ranked the other five countries' entries as their top five, proving beyond statistical coincidence that they had colluded to achieve a higher placing. This prompted the suspension of Georgia's intended jury scores (shown below) in favour of the EBU's calculated aggregate scores, shown above.

Detailed final results 
The EBU published these detailed results for a short time on 13 July 2022.

References 

2022
Countries in the Eurovision Song Contest 2022
Eurovision